Liudvikas Sabutis (born 1 February 1939, in Klaipėda) is a Lithuanian politician. In 1990 he was among those who signed the Act of the Re-Establishment of the State of Lithuania.

References
Biography 

1939 births
Living people
Members of the Seimas
21st-century Lithuanian politicians
Politicians from Klaipėda